Paris selon Moussa (Paris According to Moussa), is a 2003 Franco-Guinean drama film directed by Cheik Doukouré and produced by Danielle Ryan. The film stars director himself in the lead role whereas Élisabeth Vitali, Vincent McDoom and Magloire Delcros-Varaud made supportive roles. The film revolves around Moussa Sidibé, a farmer in Guinea who sent to France to buy a water pump and the problems faced during the journey.

The film received critics acclaim and screened worldwide. The film later won the Human Rights Award by the United Nations in 2003. In the same year, director and ead actor Doukouré won the Best Actor award at FESPACO 2003.

Cast 
 Cheik Doukouré as Moussa Sidibé
 Élisabeth Vitali as Nathalie
 Vincent McDoom as Zanzie
 Magloire Delcros-Varaud as Naomie
 Andrée Damant as La mère de Nathalie
 Mariam Kaba as Mame Traoré
 Suzanne Kouamé as Aïssatou
 Louis Navarre as Le père Albert
 Martial Odone as James
 Mamadou Fomba as Fodé Sangaré
 Sylvie Flepp as La vendeuse de pompes
 Claude Koener as Le vendeur de pompes
 Jean-Marc Truong as Chou
 Mariama Samba Baldé as Mouna
 Pascal N'Zonzi as Zanga
 Sylvestre Amoussou as Abraham
 Jean-Louis Cassarino as Julien
 Jim Adhi Limas as Ginseng
 Marie-Christine Laurent as L'hôtesse à l'aéroport
 Michel Melki in uncredited role		
 Diouc Koma in uncredited role

References

External links 
 

2003 films
French drama films
2000s French films